Christopher Schlaeffer (born 23 August 1969) is a European entrepreneur and executive. He is the Founder, CEO and Chairman of London-based technology company NYOUM. He previously served as Chief Digital Officer of VEON, Chief Product and Innovation Officer, Corporate Development Officer and Chief Strategy Officer of Deutsche Telekom, Chief Marketing Officer of T-Mobile International and CEO of T-Online. He is a Member of the Board at Amnesty International.

Early life and education

Christopher Schlaeffer was born on 23 August 1969 and raised by his mother together with 2 brothers and one sister in Maishofen, Austria. He graduated from Vienna University of Economics and Business in 1993, with a thesis on ecological tax reform.

Professional career

Schlaeffer started his career with Accenture, the international consulting, technology and outsourcing company.

In 1998 he joined Deutsche Telekom, one of the world's leading integrated telecommunications companies. In 2000, at age 31, he became Chief Strategy Officer to play a key role in Deutsche Telekom's transformation. In 2002 his responsibilities were extended to also include Research and Development, Technology (CTO) and IT (CIO) for the group.

In 2006, Schlaeffer became Deutsche Telekom's Chief Product & Innovation Officer and thus in charge of the global product portfolio. In this role he was a member of the group's Executive Operating Board and responsible for strategic partnerships with for example Apple, Samsung and Google. In 2007, Schlaeffer and Tim Cook signed Apple´s first partnership on iPhone outside the US. On 23 September 2008, together with Larry Page, Sergey Brin, Andy Rubin, Peter Chou and Cole Brodman, he announced the first mobile phone based on Android, T-Mobile G1. He also served as last CEO of T-Online, Europe’s largest ISP, before it was re-integrated into Deutsche Telekom’s fixed-line business.

In 2010, Schlaeffer left Deutsche Telekom to become an entrepreneur and founded yetu. After 4 years of development at IFA Consumer Electronics Show 2014 in Berlin yetu launched the world´s first open connected home platform for web applications usable across devices and operating systems. In 2015 Schlaeffer had to wind down yetu due to a failed funding round, but utilized the open source technology to found NYOUM, a multi-service delivery platform for the connected home.

In 2016 VEON, one of the largest mobile network operators in the world with more than 200 million customers, appointed Schläffer as Chief Commercial and Digital Officer and member of its Group Executive Committee to help transform the traditional telco into a tech company out of London. In this role, he was instrumental in returning the business to revenue growth, rebranding the company into VEON and the development of a free internet platform integrating communication, messaging and applications into a new eco-system for a contextual internet. 

In 2018, Schlaeffer left VEON and returned to being an entrepreneur as Founder and Executive Chairman of NYOUM. In 2021, NYOUM launched its video-first communication platform, called LOVE, in the US on the iOS operating system. In 2022 LOVE also launched on the Android operating system and across Asia.

Personal life

Schlaeffer is the father of 2 daughters and one son. 

He is an advocate of an “eco-social” market economy, equality and an open information society. Schlaeffer is a Member of the Board at Amnesty International and the Patron of iamtheCODE.org, a charity supporting girls from marginalised communities to become coders.

Honors, awards, positions

In 2007, Christopher Schlaeffer was recognized as a “Young Global Leader” by the World Economic Forum.
As founder of yetu, Christopher received the German Energy Efficiency Prize as well as the award „Landmark in the Land of Ideas“ dedicated to the digital revolution by the German Federal President in 2015. Christopher was named one of the "100 Most Innovative Chief Digital Officers globally" as well as one of the “Top50 Innovators To Watch”.

In 2022, Christopher Schlaeffer was honoured as “Manager of the Year” in his home country Austria by the Vienna University of Economics.

Works

 Applied Technology and Innovation Management, Arnold H., Erner M., Möckel P., Schläffer C, Springer, Berlin (2010), 
Münchner Kreis: “Prospects and Opportunities of Information and Communication Technologies (ICT) and Media”, 2009
 Umsetzung von offener Innovation durch industrielle Cluster und Public Private Partnerships, Bub U., Schläffer C., published in  Beschleunigte Innovation mit regionalen und industrienahen Forschungsclustern IRB Verlag (2008), 
Convergent Media & Networks, Keynote Speech at the 12th German-Japanese Symposium, 2007

References

1969 births
Austrian businesspeople
Living people